Monkey Business is a 2022 Spanish comedy film directed and written  by Daniel Guzmán, who also stars alongside Joaquín González and Luis Tosar.

Plot 
The plot follows Joaquín, a go-getter living in Orcasitas with his mother, his daughter and his brother. Upon being handed a notice about the foreclosure of their appartment due to a loan, and teaming up with another two scoundrels from his past (Brujo and Luismi), Joaquín tries to get the money to avoid the eviction, but things go from bad to radically worse.

Cast

Production 
Penned by Guzmán (raised in Aluche), the screenplay fictionalizes the former's childhood friend Joaquín González (raised in Orcasitas). In addition to González, Guzmán and Tosar, the rest of the characters are played by a mix of a non-professional cast members (including González's family) as well as professional actors such as Luis Zahera, Julián Villagrán, Miguel Herrán, and Antonio Durán "Morris". The film was produced by Movistar Plus+ alongside El Niño Producciones, Zircocine and La Canica Films. Ibon Antuñano worked as director of cinematography.

Release 
The film premiered in the official selection of the 25th Málaga Film Festival on 19 March 2022. Distributed by Universal Pictures International Spain, it was theatrically released in Spain on 1 April 2022.

Reception 
Beatriz Martínez of El Periódico de Catalunya rated the film 3 out of 5 stars assessing that, taking advantage of the blurrying of the fictional and the real, the helmer manages to "generate a comic device that is much more precise than it might seem at first sight and that works (despite some drops in rhythm in its central part) in an unprejudiced and playful, parodic and self-conscious way".

Carlos Marañón of Cinemanía rated the film 3 out of 5 stars, considering that Guzmán is brave in daring to make "a personal story that maintains a complicated relationship with verisimilitude and yet has an undeniable connection to reality", with the narration being underpinned by a "Berlanguian" chorality.

Carmen L. Lobo of La Razón rated it 3 out of 5 stars, highlighting "the honesty and affection with which Guzman portrays these con artists", while pointing out that the film could have benefited from a final revision of its editing.

Josu Eguren of El Correo rated the film 2 out of 3 stars, deeming it to be "an honest and genuine film, with the flavor of the best popular cinema".

See also 
 List of Spanish films of 2022

References 

Films set in Madrid
2022 comedy films
2020s Spanish films
2020s Spanish-language films
Spanish comedy films